Poland sent 12 competitors to compete in three disciplines at the 2010 Winter Paralympics in Vancouver, Canada.

Medalists

Bronze
 Katarzyna Rogowiec - Cross-country skiing, 15 km Individual Freestyle

Alpine skiing

Biathlon

Cross-country skiing

See also
Poland at the 2010 Winter Olympics
Poland at the Paralympics

References

External links
Vancouver 2010 Paralympic Games official website
Polish Paralympic Committee
International Paralympic Committee official website

Nations at the 2010 Winter Paralympics
2010
2010 in Polish sport